The 2010 Cork Premier Intermediate Hurling Championship was the seventh staging of the Cork Premier Intermediate Hurling Championship since its establishment by the Cork County Board in 2004. The championship began on 4 June 2010 and ended on 10 October 2010.

On 30 July 2010, Fr. O’Neill’s were relegated from the championship following a 1-15 to 0-10 defeat by Aghabullogue.

On 10 October 2010, Ballymartle won the championship following a 2-14 to 0-13 defeat of Tracton in the final. It remains their only championship title in this grade.

Tracton's Ronan Walsh was the championship's top scorer with 2-57. It remains a record cumulative score for a player in a single championship.

Teams

A total of 16 teams contested the Premier Intermediate Championship, including 14 teams from the 2009 premier intermediate championship, one relegated from the 2009 senior championship and one promoted from the 2009 intermediate championship.

Team changes

To Championship

Promoted from the Cork Intermediate Hurling Championship
 Fermoy

Relegated from the Cork Senior Hurling Championship
 Castlelyons

From Championship

Promoted to the Cork Senior Hurling Championship
 Douglas

Relegated to the Cork Intermediate Hurling Championship
 St. Catherine’s

Results

Round 1

Round 2

Round 3

Relegation play-off

Round 4

Quarter-finals

Semi-finals

Final

Championship statistics

Top scorers

Top scorer overall

Top scorers in a single game

Miscellaneous

 There was confusion at the end of the semi-final between Tracton and Youghal, with the scoreboards in Páirc Uí Chaoimh reading 1-12 a-piece though many had Tracton on 1-13 at the final whistle. The uncertainty centred on a second-half Sean O’Sullivan effort for Tracton – many credited the Tracton player with a point to put his side three ahead but it is understood the ball went wide, and late in the game the scoreboard display at both ends was changed out of sequence to ‘deduct’ a point from Tracton.

References

Cork Premier Intermediate Hurling Championship
Cork Premier Intermediate Hurling Championship